Enhydrobacter aerosaccus is a gram negative, catalase- and oxidase-positive, non motile bacterium which contains gas vacuoles from the genus of Enhydrobacter which was isolated from the Wintergreen Lake in Michigan.

References

External links
Type strain of Enhydrobacter aerosaccus at BacDive -  the Bacterial Diversity Metadatabase

 	

Moraxellaceae
Bacteria described in 1987